The bigeye scad (Selar crumenophthalmus) is a species of oceanic fish found in tropical regions around the globe. Other common names include purse-eyed scad, goggle-eyed scad, akule, chicharro, charrito ojón, jacks, matang baka, mushimas and coulirou. The bigeye scad is fished commercially, both for human consumption and for bait.

Description
The bigeye scad is blue-green or green on its back and sides and white on the underside. It grows to about 15 inches (38 cm) long and feeds on small invertebrates, fish larvae, and zooplankton. It is a schooling fish, it is mostly nocturnal, and it prefers clean, clear insular waters.

Uses
The bigeye scad are fished commercially; the global catches are about 200 thousand tonnes per year. They are highly valued as food in Asian and Pacific cultures. In Maldivian cuisine it is known as mushimas and commonly eaten in garudhiya or fried. In Florida and the Caribbean, they are popular as bait.

Parasites
Parasites of the bigeye scad include the philometrid nematode Philometra selaris, which lives inside the ovary of the females.

References

External links

 
 Australian Museum Fish Site species page
 Guam Department of Agriculture's Division of Aquatic & Wildlife Resources species page
 Bigeye scad stock video footage
 University of Rhode Island page with sound files of bigeye scads producing grating sounds with their teeth
 

bigeye scad
Pantropical fish
bigeye scad